Milíkov is a municipality and village in Cheb District in the Karlovy Vary Region of the Czech Republic. It has about 300 inhabitants.

Administrative parts
Villages of Malá Šitboř, Mokřina, Těšov and Velká Šitboř are administrative parts of Milíkov.

Geography
It lies on the border between the Cheb Basin and Slavkov Forest. The Lipoltovský creek flows through the municipality.

History
The first written mention of Milíkov is from 1311.

Gallery

References

External links

Villages in Cheb District